Langley Mill is a large village in the Amber Valley district of Derbyshire, England.

History
Originally named Long Lea, the village of Langley Mill was a major employer throughout the mid 1900s with many companies including The Flour Mill, Langley Mill Pottery, Aristoc & Co Ltd, G.R. Turner Ltd., and Vic Hallam Limited.

Aristoc, originally on North Street, manufactured silk stockings within the village. During the Second World War, when its manufacturing included parachutes and inflatable dinghies for the war effort, it became a target for German bombers. The buildings have been replaced with housing.

The now closed Victory greyhound racing track was opened on ground adjoining the New Inn on 19 April 1930. As a flapping (independent) track it was not affiliated to the sports governing body, the National Greyhound Racing Club. The principal distances for greyhound racing was 330 and 500 yards; the track also held whippet races.

International superbike champion Ron Haslam came from Langley Mill. He won international motorcycle titles in the 1970s and early 1980s.

Geography
Langley Mill is at the junction of the Erewash Canal, the Cromford Canal, and the Nottingham Canal.

The village, part of the Aldercar and Langley Mill parish, is on the border of Nottinghamshire, and is conjoined to the settlements of Aldercar (to the north) and Heanor (to the south-west), with the neighbouring village of Langley in the Heanor and Loscoe parish. Across the River Erewash is the Nottinghamshire town of Eastwood. The Erewash was the Aldercar and Langley Mill boundary; this moved in 1992 to the A610, the Erewash Canal basin becoming part of Langley Mill.

The A610 £2.5 million Langley Mill Bypass was opened on 8 September 1983, by the leader of Derbyshire County Council.

Community
National chain outlets in the village include KFC, Home Bargains and McDonald's. There are two supermarkets: Asda, which includes one of the village's two petrol filling stations, and Lidl. The second petrol station, owned by a petroleum company, includes a Starbucks outlet.

The village's Langley Mill railway station is on the Erewash Valley Line.

See also
List of places in Derbyshire
Listed buildings in Aldercar and Langley Mill

References

External links
Heanor and District Local History Society, whose web site has several pages connected with Langley Mill 
Langley Mill Baptist Church was the first church to be built in Langley Mill and has an interesting history

Villages in Derbyshire